Tikam Singh Rana (Hindi: टीकम सिंह राणा) (Dr T.S. Rana), is an Indian plant biologist, specializing in Plant Taxonomy, Conservation Biology, and Molecular Systematics. He is presently working as Chief Scientist, Head and Area Coordinator of the Plant Diversity, Systematics and Herbarium (PDSH) Division at CSIR-National Botanical Research Institute (CSIR-NBRI), Lucknow. Rana’s contributions to understanding the taxonomy and phylogeny of taxonomically complex and economically important taxa like Murraya sp., Chenopodium sp., Ocimum sp., Jatropha curcas, Taxus sp., Ephedra sp., Acorus calamus, Ficus sp., Sapindus sp., Bergenia sp., Betula sp., Uraria sp., Gymnema sp., etc. employing both phenotypic and molecular markers (RAPD, DAMD, ISSR, AFLP, SSRs and  genes from nuclear ribosomal and chloroplast  DNAs are exemplary). Rana has immensely contributed towards the capacity building in plant taxonomy and bi-systematics by coordinating hands-on training courses from 2012 to 2018 for young faculty and students pursuing plant taxonomy in Indian Universities and Institutions.

Education and career 
Rana received bachelor's degree (1986-1988) in Chemistry, Zoology, and Botany, and a master's degree (1988-1990) in Botany from the DBS (PG) College, Dehra Dun and  DAV (PG) College, Dehra Dun (HNB, Garhwal University, Srinagar, Uttarakhand), respectively. He then joined as Junior Scientist at CSIR-National Botanical Research Institute in 1992. Thereon, he severed as Scientist (1997-2001), Senior Scientist (2002-2005), Principal Scientist (2006-2010), and Senior Principal Scientist (2011-2017). While as a staff scientist he did doctoral research (Ph.D.), and worked on ‘Floristic Studies and Assessment of Biodiversity in the Tons Valley (Garhwal   Himalaya) Uttar Pradesh’ from the University of Lucknow, Lucknow (2000). Presently, he is working as Chief Scientist at CSIR-NBRI, Lucknow. Rana is also worked as a postdoctoral fellow at Institute of Plant Genetics and Crop Plant Research (IPK), Gatersleben, Germany, under BOYSCAST Fellowship (2001-2002) with Prof. Konrad Bachman.

Rana has over three decades research experience and is one of the foremost contemporary plant biologists whose scientific contributions range from classical plant taxonomy to modern molecular systematics, which is a unique blend of expertise, rarely found in the country.  Dr. Rana has made outstanding contributions in Plant Taxonomy and Molecular Systematics. Assessment of biodiversity (floristic aspects) in the Himalayan regions such as Tons Valley, Govind wildlife Sanctuary, Corbett Tiger Reserve and Kumaun Himalaya (particularly on Weeds) and Indian Mangroves (Sonneratia) are the significant achievements, wherein a firsthand field information and critical evaluation of plants have been provided [Flora of Tons Valley Garhwal Himalaya (Uttaranchal), 2003; The Weeds of Kumaun Himalayan Region (Uttarakhand), 2016;  Indian Mangroves: A photographic field identification guide, 2021]. He has published over 113 research papers and four books as author and co-author.  Rana has immensely contributed towards the capacity building in Plant Taxonomy and Biosystematics by organizing hands-on training courses and conferences for young faculties and students who are pursuing Plant Taxonomy in Indian Universities and Institutions. A book entitled ‘Plant Taxonomy and Biosystematics: Classical and Modern Methods’ (2014) authored by him, has a plethora of information on the variety of traditional and modern concepts of Plant Systematics.

Eponymy 
Gentiana ranae (Gentianaceae), a new species from India, have been named after Rana in recognition of his contribution to the field of plant molecular systematics.

Awards and recognition 
 Fellow of the Linnean Society (2020), London (FLS)
 Fellow of the Indian Botanical Society (FBS)
 BOYSCAST Fellowship (2001-2002)
 Fellow of Ethnobotanical Society of India (FES)
 Fellow of Indian Association for Angiosperm Taxonomy (FIAAT)

References 

Living people
21st-century Indian botanists
Indian taxonomists
1969 births
Fellows of the Linnean Society of London